San Buenaventura (named for St. Bonaventure) is a city in the Mexican state of Chihuahua. It serves as the municipal seat for the Buenaventura Municipality.

As of 2010, the municipality had a total population of 6,957, down from 9,402 as of 2005.

History
In 1660 Capitán Juan de Munguía and Villela and Fr. Gerónimo de Birues founded the settlement of The Valley of San Buenaventura with Chinarra and Suma people.

Ethnicities
The vast majority of the population is Mestizo, they are descended from the Spanish settlers and the Chinarra and Suma people.

References

Populated places in Chihuahua (state)
1660 establishments in New Spain